The ONDA (Spanish for "Wave") is a revolutionary left-wing organization that is currently based in Mérida, Venezuela.

The ONDA does not support Venezuelan President Hugo Chávez, but it works within the framework of Chavismo. For example, the ONDA is currently (September 2005) working towards the creation of neighborhood assemblies with decision-making power (rather than mere advisory power as allowed under the new constitution).

See also
 Comision de Relaciones Anarquistas

Political movements